Nikhom Nam Un is a district (amphoe) in the western part of Sakon Nakhon province, northeast Thailand.

Geography
Neighboring districts are (from the north clockwise) Waritchaphum, Phanna Nikhom and Kut Bak of Sakon Nakhon Province, and Wang Sam Mo of Udon Thani province.

History
In 1969 the Nam Un Dam was built in Phang Khon district, north of Nikhom Nam Un. The people living on the flooded land of districts Phang Khon, Waritchaphum, and Phanna Nikhom moved to the district.

On 16 June 1975 the minor district (king amphoe) was established, when the two tambons Nikhom Nam Un and Nong Pling were split off from Waritchaphum District. The minor district was upgraded to a full district on 4 July 1994.

Administration
The district is divided into four sub-districts (tambons), which are further subdivided into 32 villages (mubans). There are no municipal (thesaban) areas, and four tambon administrative organizations (TAO).

References

External links
amphoe.com

Nikhom Nam Un